Spartak is a rural locality (a khutor) in Loznovskoye Rural Settlement, Dubovsky District, Volgograd Oblast, Russia. The population was 88 as of 2010. There are 2 streets.

Geography 
Spartak is located in steppe, on the left bank of the Tishanka River, 42 km northwest of Dubovka (the district's administrative centre) by road. Sadki is the nearest rural locality.

References 

Rural localities in Dubovsky District, Volgograd Oblast